Desmond's was a Los Angeles-based department store, during its existence second only to Harris & Frank as the oldest Los Angeles retail chain, founded in 1862 as a hat shop by Daniel Desmond near the Los Angeles Plaza. The chain as a whole went out of business in 1981 but Desmond's, Inc. continued as a company that went in to other chains to liquidate them. Desmond's stores in Northridge and West Covina were liquidated only in 1986 and survived in Palm Springs into the first years of the 21st century.

Origins as a hat store
In 1862, the second year of the American Civil War and the 16th year that the US ruled California, Daniel Desmond arrived in the state via clipper ship via Cape Horn, Chile, as there was no transcontinental railroad. Los Angeles had a population of less than 4,500 and Desmond opened a hat shop on the Los Angeles Plaza. It measured only a few square feet and he was the only employee. Popular styles included tall, plush "toppers" that dandies wore, and wide-brimmed, flat-crowned "fiesta" hats popular with the Californio dones (gentlemen). Desmond was a member of the volunteer fire department.

Locations as a single store
In 1870 Desmond and other leading retailers moved to the Temple Block (Los Angeles) on Main Street.

In 1882, Desmond moved to no. 4 North Spring St., leading other retailers in moving to a new central business district around First and Spring streets, which was, according to the Los Angeles Times in 1937, "the rendezvous for socialites from San Francisco to Baja California". Desmond's opened in the Nadeau Block there.

In 1890, around the time that Los Angeles started horse-drawn streetcar service. Desmond moved his store to its fourth location, in the Bryson Block, 141 S. Spring St. at the northwest corner of 2nd St., which only ten years earlier had been considered "the country".

In 1900, Desmond's moved to its fifth location at Third and Spring in the Ramona Block, home to the Hotel Ramona.

In 1906, when it moved again across the street to the Douglas Building at 301 S. Spring St., its sixth home, as one of the largest retailers in Los Angeles at that time. Around this time Desmond's became a store of reference across Southern California, well known for a broad range of high quality men's attire.

In 1915, Desmond's moved to its seventh location, a new two-story building on 553 S. Spring St., and added women's and boys' shops. The building was demolished in 1924 to make way for the Pacific Southwest Trust and Savings Bank.

1924 flagship store
In 1924, Desmond's moved to its eighth and final location as a single store at 616 Broadway, a street lined at that time with many other department stores such as The Broadway, May Company, the Fifth Street Store, Silverwoods, Bullock's, N. B. Blackstone, and Eastern Columbia. 

Desmond's opened its final flagship store in 1924 at 616 South Broadway in what was then the department store district of Downtown Los Angeles.

The 616 Broadway store closed in 1972.

In 2018 the landmark building was renovated as office space, a restaurant and a rooftop bar.

Branches
Desmond's would add branch stores starting in 1927 with Seventh and Hope, and would also operate a branch in the Spring Arcade at 543 Spring Street, next door to the Pacific Southwest Trust and Savings Bank on Spring Street, which occupied the site of its former sole store.

Gallery

Ownership
Ralph R. Huesman, purchased the store from Desmond family heirs in 1921. Fred B. Huesman, his nephew,  joined Desmond's five years later. Fred succeeded his uncle as president in 1944 and continued in that position until 1973, when he took the title of chairman. In the early 1960s, New York's Cluett Peabody & Company bought Desmond's.

1977-1981 and epilogue
In 1977, a joint venture of Bond Clothing Stores and Harold Kapelovitz bought the chain, and Kapelovitz took over the management of Desmond's.

Between 1977 and 1982 Desmond's closed all but four California locations.

Meanwhile, it  opened locations across the Western United States:
Arizona
Colorado: Mesa Mall, Grand Junction
Iowa: Southern Hills Mall, Sioux City
Montana
North Dakota (2): Dickinson, Bismarck (6,000 square feet, opened 1980, closed 1986)
Texas (3): Austin, Midland, Odessa
Wisconsin

Northridge and West Covina stores continued operating until 1986.

Kapelovitz sold the Palm Springs La Plaza store to Frank Gross and Stanlee McNeish, and it continued under the Desmond's name until 2005. A separate "Desmond's Big and Tall" Store in Palm Desert Town Center continued operating after that time.

Desmonds, Inc. post-1981
Desmond's Inc. continued as a company after the Desmond's chain was closed, purchasing San Diego-based Walker Scott in 1985 and liquidating it the next year; and hired to manage the liquidation of Babbitts department store in Flagstaff, Arizona in 1987.

References
.

Defunct department stores based in Greater Los Angeles
Retail companies established in 1862
Defunct companies based in California
Buildings and structures in Los Angeles
Retail buildings in California